The Planning Institute of British Columbia (PIBC) is an association of professional planners in British Columbia and the Yukon, and is an affiliate of the Canadian Institute of Planners (CIP).  PIBC members work in the public service and the private sector, in a wide variety of fields including land use planning, environmental resource management, land development, heritage conservation, social planning, transportation planning and economic development.

The Institute is governed by a Council of elected volunteers and consists of eleven voting members, elected every two years. The Council is composed of eight Full, Fellow, or Retired Members, one Provisional Member representative, and three student representatives (one from each Recognized Planning School/Program in B.C and the Yukon). The President and Vice-President are elected by and from the Council following each bi-annual election. Council also appoints the officers, committee chairs, and other volunteer representative positions of the Institute.

PIBC was formed in 1954 by City of Vancouver Director of Planning, Gerald Sutton-Brown. Sutton-Brown's leadership, assisted significantly by the efforts of Tom McDonald of the Community Planning Association Canada (CPAC), helped to establish an organisation that remains central to the profession of planning in British Columbia to this day.  In 2006 the institute hosted the World Planners Congress in Vancouver together the Canadian Institute of Planners and the Commonwealth Association of Planners.

In 2021, the President of the Institute is Lesley Cabott.

See also
 American Institute of Certified Planners
 American Planning Association
 Global Planners Network
 Planning Institute of Australia
 Royal Town Planning Institute

References

External links
 
 2014 PIBC Excellence in Planning Award Winners

Professional planning institutes
Organizations based in Vancouver
1954 establishments in British Columbia
Organizations established in 1954